Raúl Fuster Arnao (born 23 July 1985) is a Spanish retired professional footballer who played as a left back.

He played 118 matches in Segunda División over six seasons, in representation of three clubs.

Club career
Born in Elche, Province of Alicante, Fuster made his senior debut with hometown's Elche CF's reserves, in Tercera División. After a loan to Valencian Community neighbours Villajoyosa CF he was promoted to the first team in 2007, quickly becoming a very important defensive unit.

After contributing with 27 games to Elche's sixth place in 2009–10, Fuster signed with another side in Segunda División, Gimnàstic de Tarragona. After two seasons with them, suffering relegation in his second and during which he scored his only goal as a professional in a 2–4 away loss against Córdoba CF, he was released.

In the summer of 2012, Fuster joined CD Lugo also of the second level. In the following transfer window he switched to Segunda División B where he would spend the next six years, with UD Salamanca, Lleida Esportiu, SD Ponferradina, UE Llagostera and Ontinyent CF.

On 28 March 2019, after the club's dissolution, Fuster left Ontinyent. The following month, he joined amateurs CF Intercity.

Fuster announced his retirement in August 2019, aged 34.

References

External links

1985 births
Living people
Footballers from Elche
Spanish footballers
Association football defenders
Segunda División players
Segunda División B players
Tercera División players
Divisiones Regionales de Fútbol players
Elche CF Ilicitano footballers
Elche CF players
Villajoyosa CF footballers
Gimnàstic de Tarragona footballers
CD Lugo players
UD Salamanca players
Lleida Esportiu footballers
SD Ponferradina players
UE Costa Brava players